Omoglymmius batantae is a species of beetle in the subfamily Rhysodidae. It was described by R.T. & J.R. Bell in 2009.

References

batantae
Beetles described in 2009